The Suriname national football team represents Suriname in international football. The team is controlled by the Surinamese Football Association, which is a member of CONCACAF.

History
Although the former Dutch colony is located in South America, it competes in CONCACAF, together with Guyana and French Guiana. Suriname was one of the founding members of CONCACAF in 1961. Suriname won the CFU Championship in 1978, were runners-up in 1979 and have achieved three fourth-place finishes in the CFU Championship/Caribbean Cup.
Suriname discourages dual citizenship and Surinamese-Dutch players who have picked up a Netherlands passport – which, crucially, offers legal work status in almost any European league – are barred from selection to the national team. Many Suriname-born players and Dutch-born players of Surinamese descent, like Gerald Vanenburg, Ruud Gullit, Frank Rijkaard, Edgar Davids, Clarence Seedorf, Patrick Kluivert, Aron Winter, Georginio Wijnaldum, Virgil van Dijk and Jimmy Floyd Hasselbaink have turned out to play for the Dutch national team. In 1999, Humphrey Mijnals, who played for both Suriname and the Netherlands, was elected Surinamese footballer of the century. Another famous player is André Kamperveen, who captained Suriname in the 1940s and was the first Surinamese to play professionally in the Netherlands.

Suriname has participated in the qualifying matches for the FIFA World Cup since 1962, but has never qualified for the finals. Suriname's strongest showing in World Cup qualification was the campaign for the 1978 finals, when the national team reached the final group stage.

Suriname also came second in CONCACAF qualifying for the 1964 Olympics, behind qualifiers Mexico and third in qualifying for the 1980 Olympics, behind qualifiers Costa Rica and United States. The US then boycotted the Moscow Olympics, and were replaced by Cuba in the football tournament, after Suriname opted to boycott the games as well.

In 2008 Suriname advanced to the group stage of CONCACAF World Cup qualifying despite using only local players. With their two-leg victory over neighbours Guyana, Suriname moved on to face Haiti, Costa Rica, and El Salvador in the third round.

Inspired by the success of teams with dual nationals, especially Algeria, SVB president John Krishnadath submitted a proposal to the national assembly to allow dual citizenship for athletes with the then-goal of reaching the 2018 FIFA World Cup finals. In order to support this project, a team with professional players of Surinamese origin was assembled and played an exhibition match on 26 December 2014 at the Andre Kamperveen Stadion. The project is managed by Nordin Wooter and David Endt, who have set up a presentation and sent invitations to 100 players of Surinamese origin, receiving 85 positive answers. Dean Gorré was named to coach this special selection. FIFA supported the project and granted insurance for the players and clubs despite the match being unofficial.

As of May 2015, Gorré was the national team coach who oversaw both the official and unofficial teams. The professional team consisted of players willing to commit to Suriname if the dual-citizenship bill was approved, and played two international matches. In 2016, Roberto Gödeken became the head coach once again. In qualification for the 2017 Caribbean Cup, Suriname secured a spot in the third round, but finished second behind Jamaica in their group. However, as one of the three best second-place finishers, Suriname advanced to face Trinidad and Tobago and Haiti in the 5th place play-off. Suriname won the match against Trinidad and Tobago, but lost against Haiti, and therefore once again failed to make an appearance in the Concacaf Gold Cup.

In 2018 Dean Gorré signed a new 2 year contract with the SVB to manage Natio once more. His first game ended in a draw against Dominica in Nations League qualifiers. Gorré became not only the head coach of the senior team, but also overseas the youth teams and also has a helping hand in the introduction of a professional league in the country. Gorré also managed to arrange trainingcamps for the national team in the Netherlands, where Natio have tested their strength against professional and amateur football clubs.

Suriname qualified for the CONCACAF Nations League B after wins against Saint Kitts and Nevis and British Virgin Islands, draw against Dominica and a loss against Jamaica. Suriname got to share a group with Nicaragua, SVG and Dominica. After a narrow away win against Dominica, Suriname got to bag a massive 6–0 win at home against Nicaragua.

In November 2019, it was announced that a so-called sports passport would allow Dutch professional footballers from the Surinamese diaspora to represent Suriname. On 19 November, Suriname qualified for the 2021 Gold Cup with 2–1 CONCACAF Nations League win over Nicaragua. It will be their debut in the CONCACAF Gold Cup and their first appearance in a CONCACAF tournament since 1985.

In the 2021 CONCACAF Gold Cup, Suriname played against Costa Rica, Jamaica and Guadeloupe in Group C. Suriname lost its first two matches against Jamaica and Costa Rica, but ended third in the group following a 2-1 win against Guadeloupe.

In late July, the Surinamese Football Association terminated the contract of Dean Gorré after failing to reach Natio's objectives.
After the termination of Gorré, SVB announced that they have hired the services of Brian Tevreden's Tevreden Group. The Tevreden Group are involved in the search for a new national coach and the recruitment and selection of Surinamese-Dutch professionals who want to play for Natio.

Recent results and forthcoming fixtures

The following is a list of match results in the last 12 months, as well as any future matches that have been scheduled.

2022

2023

Coaching staff

Coaching history
Caretaker managers are listed in italics.
† Indicates that they managed in no official matches

Players

Current squad

The following 23 players are selected for the Nations League match against Mexico on 23 March 2023.

Caps and goals correct as of 23 September 2022 after the match against Nicaragua.

Recent call-ups
The following players have also been called up to the Suriname squad within the last twelve months.

INJ Withdrew due to injury
PRE Preliminary/Standby squad
RET Retired from the national team
SUS Serving suspension
WD Player withdrew from the squad due to non-injury issue.

Player records

Players in bold are still active with Suriname.

Competitive record

FIFA World Cup

CONCACAF Gold Cup

CONCACAF Nations League

CFU Caribbean Cup

CCCF Championship

Pan American Games

ABCS Tournament

*Draws include knockout matches decided on penalty kicks.

All-time record against other nations
As of 1 February 2022

Team records

Wins
 Largest win 
9–0 vs  on 2 March 1947
 Largest win at the CONCACAF Championship finals  none
 Largest win at the CCCF Championship finals 
2–0 vs  Cuba on 18 February 1960, 1960 CCCF Championship
 Largest win at the CFU Championship finals 
4–0 vs  Antigua and Barbuda on 22 October 1978, 1978 CFU Championship
 Largest win at the Caribbean Cup finals 
3–1 vs  Jamaica on 28 May 1996, 1996 Caribbean Cup
 Largest win at the Pan American Games 
3–1 vs  Canada on 6 August 1991, 1991 Pan American Games
 Largest win at the CONCACAF Nations League
6–0 vs  Nicaragua on 8 September 2019, 2019–20 CONCACAF Nations League
 Largest win at the ABCS Tournament 
8–0 vs  Bonaire on 13 July 2012, ABCS Tournament 2012

Draws
 Highest scoring draw 
3–3 vs  Aruba on 29 August 1953
3–3 vs  on 2 March 1998
3–3 vs  on 12 November 2010
 Highest scoring draw at the CONCACAF Championship finals 
1–1 vs  Honduras on 23 March 1985, 1985 CONCACAF Championship
 Highest scoring draw at the CCCF Championship finals 
1–1 vs  Honduras on 15 February 1960, 1960 CCCF Championship
 Highest scoring draw at the CFU Championship finals 
2–2 vs  Guadeloupe on 29 June 1985, 1985 CFU Championship
 Highest scoring draw at the Caribbean Cup finals 
1–1 vs  Antigua and Barbuda on 16 June 1992, 1992 Caribbean Cup
1–1 vs  Saint Kitts and Nevis on 30 May 1996, 1996 Caribbean Cup
1–1 vs  Haiti on 18 May 2001, 2001 Caribbean Cup
 Highest scoring draw at the Pan American Games 
1–1 vs  Honduras on 8 August 1991, 1991 Pan American Games
 Highest scoring draw at the ABCS Tournament 
n/a1
1. Tournament follows a knock-out format, and matches cannot end on a draw.

Defeats
 Largest defeat
9–2 vs  Netherlands on 30 July 1958
8–1 vs  Aruba on 6 June 1946
8–1 vs  Mexico on 15 October 1977
Including unofficial games: 8–1 vs  Feyenoord on 13 June 1946
 Largest defeat at the CONCACAF Championship finals  8–1 vs  on 15 October 1977, 1977 CONCACAF Championship
 Largest defeat at the CCCF Championship finals 
3–1 vs  Costa Rica on 17 February 1960, 1960 CCCF Championship
 Largest defeat at the CFU Championship finals 
3–1 vs  French Guiana on 21 June 1981, 1981 CFU Championship
 Largest defeat at the Caribbean Cup finals 
4–0 vs  Saint Kitts and Nevis on 20 May 2001, 2001 Caribbean Cup
 Largest defeat at the Pan American Games 
1–0 vs  United States on 4 August 1991, 1991 Pan American Games
 Largest defeat at the ABCS Tournament 
1–0 vs  Aruba on 15 July 2012, ABCS Tournament 2012

Honours
This is a list of honours for the senior Surinamese national team
 CONCACAF Championship / Gold Cup:
 6th place: 1977
 CCCF Championship:
 4th place: 1960
 CFU Championship / Caribbean Cup:
 Winners: 1978
 Runners-up: 1979
 4th place: 1994, 1996

Other tournaments

 ABCS Tournament
 Winners: 2010, 2013, 2015
 Runners-up: 2012, 2022
 Third place: 2011
 Betty Brown Challenge Cup
 Winners: 1943
Coupe Duvalier
 Runners-up: 1966
 Parbo Bier Cup
 Runners-up: 2004

See also
Surinam Airways Flight 764

References

External links

   

 
South American national association football teams
Caribbean national association football teams
Football in Suriname